Micropentila subplagata is a butterfly in the family Lycaenidae. It is found in Cameroon and the Masaka District of Uganda. The habitat consists of primary forests.

References

Butterflies described in 1915
Poritiinae